Yuriy Metlushenko (born January 4, 1976) is a Ukrainian former professional cyclist. He became a professional in 2002 with team .

Major results

2002
1st Gran Premio della Costa Etruschi
2003
1st Beveren-Leie
1st Westrozebeke
1st Stage 2 Tour of Denmark
1st Stage 1 Tour du Poitou-Charentes
2004
1st Gran Premio della Costa Etruschi
1st Leeuwse Pijl
1st Stage 2b Brixia Tour
2008
1st Lancaster Classic
1st Stage 2 Tour de Beauce
2009
1st Stage 4 Settimana Internazionale di Coppi e Bartali
1st Prologue Szlakiem Grodów Piastowskich
1st Stage 6 Tour of Qinghai Lake
1st Stage 1 Univest Grand Prix (TTT)
1st Stage 3 Tour of Hainan
2010
 Tour of Qinghai Lake
1st Stages 4 & 5
1st Stage 1 Tour of Hainan
2011
1st Stage 6 Tour of Qinghai Lake
2012
1st Overall Tour of Trakya
1st Stages 1, 2 & 4
1st Stage 4 International Azerbaijan Tour
1st Stage 3 Baltic Chain Tour
1st Stage 4 Tour of Taihu Lake
2013
1st  Overall Tour of Taihu Lake
1st  Points classification
1st Stages 1, 2, 3, 4 & 9
2nd Tour of Nanjing
3rd Grand Prix of Vinnytsia
2016
5th Tour of Yancheng Coastal Wetlands

References

External links

1976 births
Living people
Ukrainian male cyclists
Sportspeople from Zhytomyr